Katy Jarochowicz (born 6 March 1981) is an Australian professional golfer and businesswoman. Jarochowicz plays mostly on the Australian-based ALPG Tour, and at times in the US on the LPGA Tour. She is best known for her achievements as number 1 Amateur  in her youth and winner of the Texas Open.

At 4 years old, Jarochowicz received her first golfing lesson. During her teenage years, she discovered that golf was to be her career and attended the Jack Newton Junior Golf (JNJG).  She represented Australia internationally as an amateur before turning professional in 2004. Jarochowicz later toured Australia & New Zealand on the ALPG Tour and throughout Europe on the Ladies European Tour.

Team appearances
Amateur
Espirito Santo Trophy (representing Australia): 2004
Tasman Cup (representing Australia): 2001 (winners), 2003 (winners)
Queen Sirikit Cup (representing Australia): 2003

References

1981 births
Living people
Australian female golfers